Number 25 (Fighter) Squadron (alternatively Number XXV (F) Squadron) is  squadron of the Royal Air Force, having reformed on 8 September 2018.

During the First World War, No. 25 Squadron operated as a fighter-reconnaissance unit and later as a bomber squadron. Pilots from the Squadron, Cpl. James Henry Waller and 2nd Lt. George Reynolds McCubbin, shot down the famous German fighter ace Max Immelmann in June 1916. In the Inter-war years, the Squadron was based at RAF Hawkinge, from where No. 25 Squadron's badge originated from. Throughout the Second World War, the unit flew both bombers and escorted bombers. In the 1950s, it became a night-fighter squadron. Between 1963 and 1989, No. 25 Squadron operated the Bristol Bloodhound Surface-to-Air Missile from RAF Brüggen, West Germany and later RAF Wyton, Cambridgeshire. The Squadron regained its wings in July 1989, operating the Panavia Tornado F.3 interceptor, these were flown until April 2008 when the Squadron disbanded.

Since reforming in 2018, No. 25 Squadron operates the BAE Systems Hawk T.2. It provides Advanced Fast Jet Training (AFJT) for pilots of the RAF and Royal Navy, as part of No. 4 Flying Training School at RAF Valley.

History

First World War

No. 25 Squadron was initially formed as part of the Royal Flying Corps (RFC) at Montrose, Scotland on 25 September 1915, from a nucleus provided by No. 6 (Reserve) Squadron. Upon its formation, the Squadron operated numerous types such as the Maurice Farman MF.11 Shorthorn and the Avro 504. No. 25 Squadron relocated to Barnham, Norfolk on 31 December and shortly after were equipped with the Vickers F.B.5, these however were exchanged for the Royal Aircraft Factory F.E.2b by February. The Squadron was deployed to the RFC HQ at Saint-Omer, France on 20 February, as a long-range reconnaissance and fighter unit. No. 25 Squadron was initially tasked with intercepting German aircraft, operating in the routes taken by the Luftstreitkräfte on their way to raid England. However this was proven to be ineffective and the Squadron was transferred in order to protect General Headquarters and Audruicq, flying sorties with No. 21 Squadron.

On 1 April, the Squadron relocated to the aerodrome at Auchel, operating alongside No. 18 Squadron and No. 27 Squadron. From here the Squadron supported the British 1st Army near Fromelles and Souchez. In June 1916, in preparation for the Somme Offensive, the Squadron had its ranked bolstered to 18 machines, 20 pilots and 18 observers. In the prelude to the battle, No. 25 Squadron flew reconnaissance and bombing missions behind enemy lines. On 18 June, Cpl. James Henry Waller, and his pilot 2nd Lt. George Reynolds McCubbin, shot down famous German ace Max Immelmann. This occurred during No. 25 Squadron's second encounter with Immelmann that day, after he previously shot down Lt. C. E. Rogers for his 16th victory. Immelmann, flying a Fokker E.III, engaged No. 25 Squadron over Lens and subsequently shot down Lt. J. R. B. Savage before closing in on McCubbin's F.E.2b, whose gunner, Waller, opened fire and shot him down. For their accomplishment, McCubbin was awarded the Distinguished Service Order while Waller was promoted to Sergeant and received the Distinguished Service Medal. When the offensive started on 1 July, No. 25 Squadron started flying night time bombing missions. It started operating D.H.4 bombers in June 1917.

During the course of the First World War, 25 Squadron had nine flying aces among its ranks, including James Fitz-Morris, James Green, Reginald George Malcolm, Lancelot Richardson, Noel Webb, Charles Woollven Alexander Roulstone, Leonard Herbert Emsden, and Hartley Pullan.

Interwar years
After the war the squadron acquired D.H.9s. The unit was disbanded on 31 January 1920 at RAF Scopwick. The squadron reformed the next day at RAF Hawkinge, flying Snipes, and went to Turkey in 1922/23 during the Chanak Crisis. After returning to the UK the unit stayed for a number of years at Hawkinge. The Snipes gave way to Grebes and later Siskins, while in December 1936 the squadron became the first unit to receive the Hawker Fury Mk II, having already flown the Fury Mk I since 1932. The Fury was replaced by the Hawker Demon when the squadron was given a night-fighter role. For night-flying training purposes the squadron also received Gloster Gladiators.

Second World War
No. 25(F) Squadron moved to RAF Northolt on 12 September 1938. During World War II it flew Blenheims on night patrols, which were replaced by Beaufighters and later Mosquitos. By the closing stages of the war, the squadron was almost entirely committed to bomber escort missions. The squadron was particularly successful during Operation Steinbock from January to May 1944.

Cold War

After the war No. 25 Squadron continued to operate the Mosquito NF.30 night fighter from their base at RAF West Malling until November 1951, when they were replaced by jet powered De Havilland Vampire NF.10, conversion to type having commenced in February 1951. The Vampires were then replaced by Gloster Meteor NF Mk.12 and 14s in March 1954. In 1957 the squadron moved from West Malling to RAF Tangmere, where it disbanded on 23 June 1958. On 1 July 1958 No. 153 Squadron RAF was renumbered No. 25 Squadron and the squadron flew Meteors until their replacement in 1959 by the Gloster Javelin FAW Mk.7s.

The Bloodhound missile years
No. 25 Squadron disbanded again on 30 November 1962, reforming a year later as the RAF's first Bristol Bloodhound SAM unit, based at RAF North Coates. In this role the squadron moved to RAF Bruggen in 1970, with detachments also protecting RAF Laarbruch and RAF Wildenrath. In 1983 the squadron moved to RAF Wyton, similarly protecting RAF Barkston Heath and RAF Wattisham.

On Tornados

The RAF withdrew the Bloodhound from 25 Squadron in October 1989 and the squadron immediately reformed at RAF Leeming as a RAF Tornado F3 fighter squadron, which became operational in January 1990, alongside 11 Squadron and 23 Squadron as part of No. 11 Group RAF. Between September – December 1993 and May – August 1995, No. 25 (F) Squadron aircrew and groundcrew took part in Operation Deny Flight, a NATO-led operation enforcing the United Nations (UN) no-fly zone over Bosnia-Herzegovina. Operating out of Gioia del Colle Air Base near Bari, Italy, on each occasion the squadron took over responsibility for supporting the no-fly zone from 23 Squadron before being relieved by 5 Squadron from RAF Coningsby. In the late 1990s the squadron deployed operationally to Saudi Arabia to protect the Shi'ite Muslims of southern Iraq by flying Combat Air Patrol missions below the 33rd parallel, enforcing the southern no-fly zone imposed by Operation Southern Watch. Between October 2004 and January 2005 a contingent of 4 aircraft from 25(F) Sqn was deployed to Siauliana Air Base in Lithuania to provide NATO Air Defence cover to Lithuania, Latvia and Estonia, following their membership of NATO. Within the United Kingdom the Squadron's primary role, along with 11(F) Sqn prior to their disbandment, was QRA(S), Quick Reaction Alert (South), providing air defence for the Southern UK. Most publicly the Squadron intercepted eight Russian Tu-95 Bear-H strategic bombers and two Tu-160 Blackjack strategic bombers in July 2007. The squadron disbanded on 4 April 2008, its Tornados relocating to RAF Leuchars to join the remaining active Tornado F3 squadrons stationed there.

Advanced flying training
In August 2018, it was announced that, due to the increased demand for fast jet pilots in both the RAF and the Fleet Air Arm following the entry into service of the F-35B Lightning, the existing Hawk T.2 squadron at 4 FTS would be split into two, with No. IV (AC) Squadron to be joined by a newly reformed No. 25 Squadron by the end of 2018. No. 25 Squadron will takeover the jet conversion tasks, with No. IV Squadron focusing on tactics and weapons training.

See also
Richard Haine
List of Royal Air Force aircraft squadrons

References

Notes

Bibliography

 Ashworth, Chris. Encyclopedia of Modern Royal Air Force Squadrons. Wellingborough, UK:PSL, 1989. .
 Bowyer, Michael J.F and John D.R. Rawlings. Squadron Codes, 1937–56. Cambridge, Cambridgeshire, UK: Patrick Stephens Ltd., 1979. .
 Flintham, Vic and Andrew Thomas. Combat Codes: A Full Explanation and Listing of British, Commonwealth and Allied Air Force Unit Codes Since 1938. Shrewsbury, Shropshire, UK: Airlife Publishing Ltd., 2003. .
 Franks, Norman, et al. Above the War Fronts: the British Two-seater Bomber Pilot and Observer Aces, the British Two-seater Fighter Observer Aces, and the Belgian, Italian, Austro-Hungarian and Russian Fighter aces, 1914–1918: Volume 4 of Fighting Airmen of WWI Series: Volume 4 of Air Aces of WWI. Oxford, UK; Grub Street, 1997, 
 Halley, James J. Famous Fighter Squadrons of the RAF: Volume 1. Windsor, Berkshire, UK: Hylton Lacey, 1971. .
 Halley, James J. The Squadrons of the Royal Air Force & Commonwealth, 1918–1988. Tonbridge, Kent, UK: Air-Britain (Historians) Ltd., 1988. .
 Jefford, C.G. RAF Squadrons, a Comprehensive Record of the Movement and Equipment of all RAF Squadrons and their Antecedents since 1912. Shrewsbury: Airlife Publishing, 1998 (second edition 2001). .
 Mackay, Ron (2011). The Last Blitz: Operation Steinbock, the Luftwaffe's Last Blitz on Britain – January to May 1944. Red Kite. 
 Mason, Francis K. Hawks Rising, the Story of No.25 Squadron Royal Air Force. Tonbridge, Kent, UK: Air-Britain (Historians) Ltd., 2001. .
 Rawlings, John D.R. Fighter Squadrons of the RAF and their Aircraft. London: Macdonald and Jane's (Publishers) Ltd., 1969 (new edition 1976, reprinted 1978). .
 Shores, Christopher, et al. Above the Trenches: A Complete Record of the Fighter Aces and Units of the British Empire Air Forces 1915–1920. Oxford UK, Grub Street, 1990. , .
 Wragg, David (2007). Royal Air Force Handbook 1939-1945. The History Press.

External links

 Royal Air Force: 25 Squadron
 XXV Squadron Association

Flight training in the United Kingdom
025
Military units and formations established in 1915
025
1915 establishments in the United Kingdom